Abshur or Ab Shur or Ab-e Shur may refer to:
 Abshur, Fars
 Ab-e Shur, Fars
 Abshur, Hormozgan
 Ab Shur, Kerman
 Abshur, Razavi Khorasan
 Abshur Rural District, in Fars Province